Graph pebbling is a mathematical game played on a graph with zero or more pebbles on each of its vertices. 'Game play' is composed of a series of pebbling moves. A pebbling move on a graph consists of choosing a vertex with at least two pebbles, removing two pebbles from it, and adding one to an adjacent vertex (the second removed pebble is discarded from play). π(G), the pebbling number of a graph G, is the lowest natural number n that satisfies the following condition:  
Given any target or 'root' vertex in the graph and any initial configuration of n pebbles on the graph, it is possible, after a series of pebbling moves, to reach a new configuration in which the designated root vertex has one or more pebbles.

For example, on a graph with 2 vertices and 1 edge connecting them the pebbling number is 2. No matter how the two pebbles are placed on the vertices of the graph it is always possible to move a pebble to any vertex in the graph.  One of the central questions of graph pebbling is the value of π(G) for a given graph G.

Other topics in pebbling include cover pebbling, optimal pebbling, domination cover pebbling, bounds, and thresholds for pebbling numbers, as well as deep graphs.

π(G) — the pebbling number of a graph
The game of pebbling was first suggested by Lagarias and Saks, as a tool for solving a particular problem in number theory. In 1989 F.R.K. Chung introduced the concept in the literature and defined the pebbling number, π(G).

The pebbling number for a complete graph on n vertices is easily verified to be n: If we had (n − 1) pebbles to put on the graph, then we could put one pebble on each vertex except the target.  As no vertex has two or more pebbles, no moves are possible, so it is impossible to place a pebble on the target.  Thus, the pebbling number must be greater than n − 1.  Given n pebbles, there are two possible cases.  If each vertex has one pebble, no moves are required.   If any vertex is bare, at least one other vertex must have two pebbles on it, and one pebbling move allows a pebble to be added to any target vertex in the complete graph.

π(G) for families of graphs
The pebbling number is known for the following families of graphs:
, where  is a complete graph on n vertices.
, where  is a path graph on n vertices.
, where  is a wheel graph on n vertices.

Graham's pebbling conjecture

 credited Ronald Graham with the conjecture that the pebbling number of a Cartesian product of graphs is at most equal to the product of the pebbling numbers of the factors in the product. This has come to be known as Graham's pebbling conjecture. , it remains unsolved, although special cases are known.

γ(G) — the cover pebbling number of a graph
Crull et al. introduced the concept of cover pebbling. γ(G), the cover pebbling number of a graph is the minimum number of pebbles needed so that from any initial arrangement of the pebbles, after a series of pebbling moves, the graph is covered: there is at least one pebble on every vertex. A result called the stacking theorem finds the cover pebbling number for any graph.

The stacking theorem
According to the stacking theorem, the initial configuration of pebbles that requires the most pebbles to be cover solved happens when all pebbles are placed on a single vertex. Based on this observation, define

 

for every vertex v in G, where d(u, v) denotes the distance from u to v. Then the cover pebbling number is the largest s(v) that results.

γ(G) for families of graphs
The cover pebbling number is known for the following families of graphs:
, where  is a complete graph on n vertices.
, where  is a path on n vertices.
, where  is a wheel graph on n vertices.

See also
 Pebble game
 Proof of space

References

Further reading

Graph invariants